The Itsekiri (also called the Isekiri, iJekri, Itsekri, Ishekiri, or Itsekhiri) are one of the Yoruboid subgroup of Nigeria's Niger Delta area, Delta State. The Itsekiris presently number 2.7 million people and live mainly in the Warri South, Warri North and Warri South West local government districts of Delta State on the Atlantic coast of Nigeria. Significant communities of Itsekiris can be found in parts of Edo and Ondo states and in various other Nigerian cities including Lagos, Benin City, Port Harcourt and Abuja. Many people of Itsekiri descent also reside in the United Kingdom, the United States and Canada. The Itsekiris are closely related to the Yoruba of South Western Nigeria and also close to the Okpe people and Edo peoples.
The Itsekiris traditionally refer to their land as the Kingdom of Warri or 'Iwere' as its proper name – which is geographically contiguous to the area covered by the three Warri local government districts. The area is a key centre of Nigeria's crude oil and natural gas production and petroleum refining and the main town Warri (a multi-ethnic metropolis) forms the industrial and commercial nucleus of the Delta State region.

Ethnography
The Itsekiri are a people of very mixed ethnic origins who speak a language very closely related to the Yoruba of south western Nigeria and the Igala language of central Nigeria but which has also borrowed some cultural practice from the Ijebu people, Ile-Ife and Benin, they engaged with Portuguese in trade terminologies, as the Itsekiri were the first people in Nigeria to establish contact with the Portuguese who were exploring the West African coast, and also more recently, English. Although linguistically related to the Yoruba and Igala ethnic groups, however, through centuries of intermingling modern day Itsekiris are of mixed ethnic origins. They are most closely related to the South-Eastern and South-South Yorubaland sub-groups - Ijebu, Akure, Ikale, Ilaje, Ondo and Owo, but also Edo, Urhobo, Ijaw, Anglo-Scottish and Portuguese and are today mainly Christian (Protestant and Roman Catholic) by religion.

Thus having had six centuries of direct cultural exposure to Western Christianity and other African influences, contemporary Itsekiri language and culture has successfully evolved into a hybrid of the many cultures that have influenced its development. Similarly owing to the complex genetic mix of most Itsekiris over the centuries, many individuals self-identifying as Itsekiri would usually be a complex mix of any of the aforementioned ethnic and racial groups. Thus modern day Itsekiris may be the only southern Nigerian ethnic group to be almost totally heterogeneous (mixed) in its genetic composition. The total absence of any dialectal variation in the Itsekiri language is also unique for the region and is most likely the result of the early coalescing of the Itsekiri people into a small and highly centralised nation state from the 15th century onward.

History
The Itsekiri monarchy has continued to the present day, with ogiame Olu atuwatse III as king of Warri Kingdom. The Itsekiri's historical capital is Ode-Itsekiri (also called "big warri" or "Ale iwerre"), though the monarch's main palace is in Warri town: the largest city in the area and home to diverse other communities, including the Urhobos, Ijaws, Isoko, and many other Nigerian and expatriate groups working in the oil and gas industry.

Itsekiris today
The Itsekiri, though a minority group within Nigeria, have one of the oldest histories of western education in West Africa, for the Itsekiri in particular there is a sense of pride associated with western education. In the Warri Kingdom, one the earliest instances of the pursuit of a western education by a Nigerian was by a Itsekiri prince in 1600. and are noted for producing one of its earliest university graduates – the Olu of Warri Kingdom, Olu Atuwatse I, Dom Domingo a 17th-century graduate of Coimbra University in Portugal.

Culture
The Itsekiris traditionally lived in a society that was governed by a monarchy (the Olu) and council of chiefs who form the nobility or aristocracy. Itsekiri society itself was organised along the lines of an upper class made up of the royal family and the aristocracy – the 'Oloyes and Olareajas' these were mainly drawn from noble houses including the Royal Houses and the Houses of Olgbotsere (Prime Minister or king maker) and Iyatsere (defence minister). The middle class or Omajaja were free-born Itsekiris or burghers. As a result of the institution of slavery and the slave trade there was a third class 'Oton-Eru' or those descended from the slave class whose ancestors had come from elsewhere and settled in Itsekiriland as indentured or slave labourers. In modern-day Itsekiri society the slave class no longer exists as all are considered free-born.

Traditionally, Itsekiri men wear a long sleeved shirt called a Kemeje, tie a George wrapper around their waist and wear a hat with a feather stuck to it. The women wear a blouse and also tie a George wrapper around their waist. They wear colourful head gears known as Nes (scarf) or coral beads. Itsekiris are also famed for their traditional fishing skills, melodious songs, gracefully fluid traditional dances and colourful masquerades and boat regattas.

Religion
Before the introduction of Christianity in the 16th century, like many other African groups, the Itsekiris largely followed a traditional form of religion known as Ebura-tsitse (based on ancestral worship) which has become embedded in modern-day traditional Itsekiri culture. Once the dominant form of western Christianity in Itsekiriland for centuries,  only a minority of Itsekiris are Roman Catholics today whilst the majority are Protestants notably Baptist and Anglican.

Itsekiri language

Whilst genetically the Itsekiris are a complex mixture of the many different ethnicities and races that have settled in their area, the Itsekiri language is very closely related to the Ilaje and other south-eastern Yoruba dialects and to the Igala. It has also been influenced significantly by the Bini, Portuguese and English languages due to centuries of interaction with people from those nations. However, it remains a key branch of the Yoruboid family of languages even retaining archaic or lost elements of the proto Yoruba language due to its relative isolation in the Niger-Delta where it developed away from the main cluster of Yoruba language dialects.

Unlike nearly all key Nigerian Languages, the Itsekiri language does not have dialects and is uniformly spoken with little or no variance in pronunciation apart from the use of 'ch' for the regular 'ts' (sh) in the pronunciation of some individual Itsekiris, e.g. Chekiri instead of the standard Shekiri but these are individual pronunciation traits rather than dialectal differences. This may be a relic of past dialectal differences. The English language continues to exert a strong influence on the Itsekiri language both in influencing its development and in its widespread usage as a first language amongst the younger generation. Modern standard Yoruba (the variety spoken in Lagos) also appears to be influencing the Itsekiri language partly due to the similarity between both languages and the ease of absorbing colloquial Yoruba terms by the large Itsekiri population living in Western Nigerian cities. Itsekiri is now taught in local schools up to university degree level in Nigeria.

There are a number of semi-autonomous Itsekiri communities such as Ugborodo, koko, Omadino and Obodo whose history predates the 15th-century establishment of the Warri Kingdom. The Ugborodo community claims direct descent from the Ijebu a major Yoruba sub-ethnic group

Notable people
 Ogiame Atuwatse III (Current Olu of Warri Kingdom)
 Eyimofe Atake (Senior Advocate of Nigeria)
FOM Atake, Nigerian Judge (1967-1977) and Senator of the Federal Republic of Nigeria (1979-1982)
 Ikenwoli Godfrey Emiko (Olu of Warri Kingdom)
 Nana Olomu (chief and merchant from the Niger Delta region)
 Festus Okotie-Eboh (politician, first Nigerian finance minister)
 Arthur Prest (Nigeria's first Minister of Communications, High Court Judge and High Commissioner to the UK)
 Alfred Rewane (businessman and a financier of NADECO)
 Sunday Tuoyo (Nigerian brigadier general and military governor of Ondo State)
 Misan Sagay (screenwriter)
 Emmanuel Uduaghan (politician, governor of Delta State)
 Omawumi Megbele (musician)
 Oritse Femi (musician)
 Florence Omagbemi - Nigeria U20 female football team coach and former player for the Super Falcons.
 Pastor Ayo Oritsejafor (president of the Christian Association of Nigeria)
Grace Alele-Williams (Professor of Mathematics, author and first female vice-chancellor of a Nigerian university).
 Amaju Pinnick (Nigeria Football Federation chairman)
Tuedon Morgan (Nigerian marathon runner - 2 Guinness world records)
 Sam Oritsetimeyin Omatseye (Nigerian poet and novelist)
 Dudu Omagbemi (footballer Mikkelin Pallioiliajat)
 Oritsejolomi Thomas (founder-provost of Lagos College of Medicine, vice-chancellor of University of Ibadan)
 Julie Coker (Miss Western Nigeria, broadcaster, and journalist)
 Tee Mac Omatshola Iseli (flutist and classical musician)

References

External links 
Iwe Iṣẹ ti Egwari Ṣẹkiri  The Book of Common Prayer in Isekiri
Urhobo Historical Society article
Africana Digitization Project article, "The Slave Trade in Niger Delta Oral Tradition"
Itsekiri US

 
Indigenous peoples of the Niger Delta
Ethnic groups in Nigeria